Sun Midnight Sun is the second solo album by American singer and fiddle player Sara Watkins.  It was released on May 8, 2012, by Nonesuch Records.  It reached No. 11 on the Billboard Folk Chart and No. 16 on the Heatseekers chart.

Track listing
 "The Foothills" (Sara Watkins, Blake Mills) – 1:22
 "You and Me" (Sara Watkins) – 3:23
 "You're the One I Love" (feat. Fiona Apple) (Felice and Boudleaux Bryant) - 1:45
 "When It Pleases You" (Dan Wilson) – 6:50
 "Be There" (Watkins, Mills) – 3:50
 "I'm a Memory" (Willie Nelson, arr. Mills) – 3:56
 "Impossible" (Sara Watkins, Sean Watkins, Blake Mills) – 3:54
 "The Ward Accord" (Sara Watkins, Mills) – 3:21
 "Lock & Key" (Sara Watkins, Jenny Mannan, Mills) – 3:39
 "Take Up Your Spade" (Sara Watkins) – 3:26

Chart performance

Personnel
 Sara Watkins – lead vocals, fiddle, guitar
 Sean Watkins – harmony vocals, guitar
 Blake Mills – harmony vocals, other instruments

Production
 Blake Mills – producer
 Shawn Everett – recording, mixing, mastering
 Jeri Helden – design
 Aaron Redfield – photography

References

2012 albums
Sara Watkins albums